The Rangpur Riders are a franchise cricket team based in Rangpur, Bangladesh, which plays in the Bangladesh Premier League (BPL). They are one of the seven teams that are competing in the 2017–18 Bangladesh Premier League. The team is being captained by Mashrafe Mortaza. They defeated Dhaka Dynamites in the final to be crowned the champions.

Icon player
Previous icon player Soumya Sarkar wasn't retained as icon for the Riders, resulting in the team announcing Mashrafe Mortaza as the new icon and captain.

Retention and pre-draft picks
They signed Jamaican t20 specialist, Chris Gayle before the draft. He was supposed to play 4 matches at the end but due to the postponement of the T20 Global League (where he was the marquee pick for Cape Town Knight Riders), he will play the full season but he may miss the first 3–4 matches of the Riders to be able to spent family time in a vacation in Australia. They also signed two English seam bowling all-rounder David Willey and Ravi Bopara. Their other squad members include West Indian leggie Samuel Badree and more pre-draft.

They Retained Rubel Hossain and Sohag Gazi. Both of them bowled well last season. The third retained player is Mohammad Mithun who was their second highest run scorer last season.

Draft

They picked 8 locals and 3 foreigners from the draft. Their first pick was Shahriar Nafees, a prominent Bangladeshi batsman. The surprise picks were inexperienced and little-known Afghan slow left-arm wrist-spin bowler Zahir Khan.

Post-draft picks

Due to the postponement of the T20 Global League, the team bagged Sri Lankan yorker-specialist, Lasith Malinga, who was the marquee pick for Stellenbosch Kings and one of the cleanest hitter of the cricket ball, former New Zealand captain and opener Brendon McCullum, who was the marquee pick for Jo'burg Giants.

Points table

Current squad
Players with international caps are listed in bold

References

Bangladesh Premier League